Tony Maddox is a British artist and a writer of children's books.

He was born in Birmingham, and worked there as a commercial artist in an advertising agency. His first book, Spike, the Sparrow who Couldn't Sing, was published in 1987.  He followed this up with Fergus the Farmyard Dog, which sold well, leading to nine sequels. He has had twenty-one books published which have had worldwide sales and been translated into many languages.

His book Not So Loud, Oliver!, written with Martin Clunes, was shortlisted in the Baby Book category for the 2005 Booktrust Early Years Award.

Personal life
Tony Maddox is married with four grown children, and lives in Worcestershire. His hobbies are painting and playing classical guitar.

References

Year of birth missing (living people)
Living people
People from Birmingham, West Midlands